The Shropshire Fire and Rescue Service is the statutory fire and rescue service covering Shropshire, including Telford and Wrekin, in the West Midlands region of England.

Shropshire's Fire and Rescue Service is provided by 512 full-time and retained firefighters based at 23 fire stations around the county. They currently deploy 46 operational vehicles and a number of specialist appliances.

Organisation and management

Fire Authority
Shropshire Fire and Rescue Service is governed by elected Council representatives from Shropshire's two unitary councils, Shropshire Council and Telford and Wrekin Council. Together these representatives make up the Shropshire and Wrekin Fire Authority, chaired by an elected councillor.

Day-to-day operational control of the service is vested in a chief fire officer, Rod Hammerton.

Executive control
Within the organisation the chief fire officer has full responsibility for the service and also manages finance and resources.

The remainder of executive duties fall to the senior management team, consisting of and assistant chief fire officer with responsibility for service delivery and an assistant chief fire officer with responsibility for corporate services.

Performance

Shropshire Fire and Rescue Service has achieved consistently high marks in external audits carried out by the Audit Commission.

In 2018/2019, every fire and rescue service in England and Wales was subjected to a statutory inspection by Her Majesty's Inspectorate of Constabulary and Fire & Rescue Services (HIMCFRS). The inspection investigated how well the service performs in each of three areas. On a scale of outstanding, good, requires improvement and inadequate, Shropshire Fire and Rescue Service was rated as follows:

Notable incidents
24 June 1983  a fire at the COD Donnington army ordnance depot in Telford took 140 firefighters to bring under control.

See also
 Hereford and Worcester Fire and Rescue Service
 West Mercia Police
 West Mercia Search and Rescue
 West Midlands Ambulance Service
 List of British firefighters killed in the line of duty

References

External links
 
Shropshire Fire and Rescue Service at HMICFRS

Organisations based in Shropshire
Fire and rescue services of England